The 1977–78 Duke Blue Devils men's basketball team represented Duke University. The head coach was Bill Foster. The team played its home games in the Cameron Indoor Stadium in Durham, North Carolina, and was a member of the Atlantic Coast Conference. They advanced through the NCAA tournament to the championship game, where they lost to the Kentucky Wildcats by a score of 88–94.

Schedule

Awards and honors

Team players drafted into the NBA
No one from the men's basketball team was selected in the 1978 NBA Draft. However, Jim Spanarkel was drafted 16th overall in the 1979 NBA Draft. Also, Mike Gminski was picked 7th overall in the 1980 NBA Draft, and Gene Banks and Kenny Dennard were picked 28th and 78th in the 1981 NBA Draft, respectively.

References

Duke Blue Devils
Duke Blue Devils men's basketball seasons
NCAA Division I men's basketball tournament Final Four seasons
Duke
1977 in sports in North Carolina
1978 in sports in North Carolina